This list includes all toys produced by the American toy company Mattel.

A
 Agent Zero: 1960s transforming cap gun spy gear (camera to pistol; radio to rifle)
 Aladdin film toy figures
 Aladdin TV series toy figures
 Aaahh!!! Real Monsters
 American Girl
 Apple to Apples
 Avatar action figures
 Avatar: The Last Airbender
 Atlantis: The Lost Empire toy figures

B
 Barbie 1959–present, Ken (1961–present) (dolls named after Elliot and Ruth Handler's children)
 Batman
 Batman Begins
 The Dark Knight
 The Dark Knight Rises
 Batman: The Brave and the Bold
 Batman v Superman: Dawn of Justice
 Battle Claw (2017-present)
 Battlestar Galactica (1979)
 Beauty Cuties (2006-2007)
 Big Jim action figure line
 Blaze rocking horse
 Boglins
 Boomco. (2014-present)
 Bravestarr
 Bright Beats
 Bugs Bunny (1962–1964) Talking doll, initial release 26.5 inches tall. Re-issue (1965–1975) 24 inches tall.

C
 Cabbage Patch Kids (1994–2000)
 Captain Kangaroo (1967) Talking doll, voice of Bob Keeshan, TV's Captain Kangaroo. 
 Captain Power and the Soldiers of the Future
 Cars
 Mater's Tall Tales
 Cars 2
 Tales from Radiator Springs
 Planes
 Planes: Fire and Rescue
 Cars 3
 CatDog
 Cecil the Seasick Sea Serpent (1962–1963) Talking doll, companion to Beany Boy. Inspired by the cartoon series.
 Casper the Friendly Ghost (1961–1965) Talking doll, based on the Harvey cartoon of the same name. 
 Computer Warriors (1989–1990)
 Construx
 Charmin' Chatty (1963–1964) Talking doll, Mattel's Changeable Record Doll, came with five changeable records.
 Chatty Cathy (1960–1965) Mattel's original talking doll.  The pull-string talking mechanism that was created for Chatty Cathy in 1960, and it was used in many Mattel talking dolls from 1960 to 1975.  Re-issue new doll (1970–1972) Re-issue '60s version (1998–2001).
 Creatable World (2019–present) Six construction kits for gender-neutral dolls.
 Creepy Crawlers (1964–1966) Set of molds to make bugs, snakes, and spiders from "plasti-goop." The molds and goop are heated in a hot-plate called a "Thingmaker."

D
 DC Universe Classics
 Demolition Man (toys based on Demolition Man)
 Despicable Me (2020-present)
 Minions: The Rise of Gru
 Dinosaur (toys based on Dinosaur)
 Dinotrux
 Disney Princess (2000-present)
 Diva Starz (early 2000s)
 Doctor Dolittle (1967–1968) Talking Doll, inspired by the movie of the same name. Actor Rex Harrison provides voice. Doctor Dolittle See 'N Say also available.
 Doug (1998 to 2000)
 Drowsy (1965–1975) Talking doll, First two years in flannel Kitty PJs, 1967 and after flannel Pink PJs with white dots.
 DC Super Hero Girls (2016–present)
 Dragon Ball Z

E
 Ello Creation System (2002–2004)
 Enchantimals (2017-present)
 Ever After High dolls (2013–2018)
 Extreme Dinosaurs (1997–???)

F
 Fast & Furious
 Fighting Men (1965)
 Fijit Friends
 Fisher-Price
 Flash Gordon (toys based on The New Adventures of Flash Gordon)
 Flavas
 Food Fighters
 Frozen (2013-Present)
 Frozen Fever
 Furryville

G
 Generator Rex
 Ghostbusters

H
 Halo
 Harry Potter games, etc.
 Hannah Montana (Outside of North America)
 He-Man and the Masters of the Universe
 Hercules toy figures
 High School Musical
 Hi Hi Puffy AmiYumi
 Hot Wheels (1968–present) Die cast small toy cars.
 The Hunchback of Notre Dame toy figures

J
 Jack-in-the-box (1955–present) Musical crank toy in various incarnations.
 Jayce and the Wheeled Warriors
 Jimmy Neutron: Boy Genius (film)
 Jurassic Park (2018-present)
 Jurassic World: Fallen Kingdom
 Jurassic World: Camp Cretaceous
 Jurassic World Dominion
 Justice League Unlimited
 Justice League Action
 Justice League (film)

K
 Kung Fu Panda
 Kuu Kuu Harajuku

L
 Lady Lovely Locks
 Legend Quest
 The Last Action Hero
 Laugh and Learn 
 Liddle Kiddles (1966–1972) Tiny -inch dolls, issued in many different series i.e. Storybook, Tea Party, Jewelry.
 Li'l Secrets (1993-1995), doll figures with a treasure hidden in their rooted hair.
Lil' Gleemerz (2018-present)
 Linus the Lionhearted (1965–1966) Talking Toy, inspired by cartoon character. Talking hand puppet same years.
 The Lion King
Little Mommy

M
 M.U.S.C.L.E.
 Masters of the Universe action figures
 Magic 8 Ball
 Major Matt Mason (1966–1970) "Mattel's Man in Space", 9 inch astronaut doll figure, space ship etc. available separately.
 Man-Bat
 Matchbox
 Max Steel
 Mega Man NT Warrior
 Mighty Ducks
 Mindflex
 Minecraft mini-figures
 Monogram models (1970s–1980s)
 Monster High
 Monsters, Inc.
 Mr. Ed (1964–1965) Talking hand puppet.
 Mulan
 My Child Dolls (1986–1988)
 My Meebas
 My Scene Dolls
 Mrs. Beasley (1967–1972) Talking doll, Mattel, as requested, created the doll as a companion toy for Buffy in TVs Family Affair.
 My Mini MixieQ's (2016-present)

N
 Nabi
 Naruto
 Naruto Shippuden
 The New Adventures of He-Man
 Nickelodeon toys

O
 One Piece
 Onward (film)
 Over The Moon (2020 film) (2020-present)

P
 Planet Hot Wheels
 Pixar
 Pixel Chix
 Pocahontas (Barbie type doll inspired by the 1995 Disney film)
 Polly Pocket
 Poochie
 Popples plush toys
 Pooparoos
 Porky Pig (1965–1966) Talking Toy, inspired by the Warner Bros. cartoon character.
 Power Glove
 Power Wheels
 Prehistoric Pets

R
 Disney-Pixar's Ratatouille
 Recess
 Rescue Heroes
 Rock 'Em Sock 'Em Robots (1964) First Manufactured by Marx Toys. 
 Rock 'Em Sock 'Em Robots (2001)
With the little wrenches. 
 Robo Wheels
 Rocket Power
 Rocko's Modern Life
 RoseArt
 Rugrats

S
 The Secret Saturdays
 Secret Wars (1984–1985)
 See 'n Say (1965–present) Talking toy, Series beginning with the Farmer Says, and the Bee Says, educational talking toys.
 Shaman King
 She-Ra: Princess of Power
 Shogun Warriors (late-1970s)
 Shorties (2004-2005)
 The Simpsons toy figures, games, etc.
 Sing-a-ma-jigs (2010–present) Talking, Singing computer chip toys.
 SpongeBob SquarePants
 Soul
 Strange Change Machine (1968)
 Street Sharks (1994–1996) (See also, Extreme Dinosaurs/Dino Vengers)
 Snub Nose .38 (1958) A small toy revolver that comes with a holster.
 Superman
 Superman Returns
 Man of Steel

T
 Tarzan (mid-1970s)
 Tarzan toy figures
 Teen Trends fashion dolls
 Teen Titans Go! (2017-present)
 Teen Titans Go! To the Movies
 Toy Story action figures, Little figures (Action Links) with playsets, and dolls
 Toy Story 2
 Toy Story 3
 Toy Story 4
 The Angry Beavers
 The Wild Thornberrys
 Thingmaker (1964–1975) hot-plate device to heat plasti-goop toys such as Creepy Crawlers
 Thomas the Tank Engine
 Tog'l (1968-1970) construction sets
 Tom and Jerry (1965–1966) Talking doll, Inspired by cartoon series. Talking hand puppet issued same years.
 Toss Across Bean-bag tossing game
 Turbo
 Turning Mecard''
 Tommy Burst (1962) gun with multiple firing abilities
 Thumbelina the Flower Fairy and her Three Sisters fashion dolls

U
 U.B. Funkeys
 Upsy Downsy
 Tyco R/C
 Ukedoodle

V
 Vertibird
 Voltron
 Vs. Rip-Spin Warriors

W
 Wayne Gretzky
 What's Her Face Came with markers to draw expressions on her blank face.
 Wellie Wishers
 Wheel of Fortune Two Home Versions; one in 1988 and one in 1998
 Winx Club(2004-2008)
 Wild Grinders
 Wizards of Waverly Place
 Wizzzer (1969-1975) Mattel's string-less tops issued in many color combinations and gift sets.
 Wonder Woman (animated film) 2009 Best Buy only
 Wonder Woman (2017 film)
 Wonder Woman 1984
 Welcome to the Wayne
 WWE (since 2010)
 Woody Woodpecker (1964-1965 re-issued 1972–1974) Talking doll, inspired by cartoon of the same name. Woody talking hand puppet (1964–1965).

X
 Xtractaurs

Y
 Yu-Gi-Oh! (second series anime)
 Yu-Gi-Oh! GX

Z
 Zatch Bell

See also
 List of Mattel games

References

Bibliography
Kettelkamp, Sean. "Chatty Cathy and her Talking Friends", Schiffer Publishing Ltd., 1998.

External links
Official Mattel website

Mattel